Paul Elard Cooley is an American contemporary speculative fiction writer, prolific podcaster and Systems Administrator from Houston, Texas.

Life and work
Cooley has been writing since the age of 12. In 2009, he began producing free psychological thriller and horror podcasts, essays, and reviews available from Shadowpublications.com and iTunes. Cooley is the author of a number of series of stories (many interconnected) including his 'Fiends Tales', 'Garaaga's Children', 'Tony Downs','The Street' series, and 'The Black' published by Severed Press. He has also co-written an episode of Scott Sigler 'The Crypt' audio anthology series as well as the novella, 'The Rider' set in Sigler's GFL universe (to be released).

Cooley's works have been published by Severed Press, via Blue Moose Press, e-published by Dark Overlord Media and self-published. Many works of fiction are also available as digital audio downloads in podcast form.

Cooley co-hosts the Dead Robots' Society podcast, a weekly roundtable discussion podcast examining issues related to writing with a speculative fiction focus and has lent his voice talent to many podcast fiction productions.

Awards
Parsecs

Winner of the Parsec for 'The Black' in 2015 in the category of Best Speculative Fiction Story: Small Cast (Novella & Long Form)

Compete History
In 2010, his short story 'Canvas' and novella 'Tattoo' were nominated for Parsec Awards. 'Tattoo' became a Parsec Award finalist. 
In 2013, 'Mimes' and 'Garaaga's Children: Scrolls' were both chosen as finalists.
In 2015, 'The Black' was a finalist and won for Best Speculative Fiction Story: Small Cast (Novella & Long Form)

Charitable works
Cooley donates $2 from each sale of The Street (which Cooley characterizes his 'The Street' series of horror/satire stories as 'dystopian muppet fiction') to the Sesame Workshop.

Cooley contributed the story 'Breakers' to the horror anthology "Dead Ends", a charity anthology with all net proceeds going to 
benefit the Office of Letters and Light: http://lettersandlight.org/.

Books in Print
Paul E Cooley (2014), The Street, Shadowpublications.com
Paul E Cooley (2011), Fiends, Volume 1,  Blue Moose Press
Paul E Cooley (2014), "The Black", Severed Press
Paul E Cooley (2015), "The Black: Arrival", Severed Press
Paul E Cooley (2014), "Legends of Garaaga", Shadow Publications
Paul E Cooley (2015), "Daemons of Garaaga", ISBN, 194-2137036, Shadow Publications
Paul E Cooley (2016), " The Black: Outbreak", Severed Press
Paul E Cooley, (2016), "Closet Treats", Shadow Publications

eBooks Available

Paul E Cooley (2014), "The Black", published by Severed Press
Paul E Cooley (2015), "The Black: Arrival", published by Severed Press
Paul E Cooley (2016), "The Black: Outbreak", published by Severed Press
Paul E Cooley (2014), "The Street"
Paul E Cooley (2014) "Garaaga's Children: Ancients"
Paul E Cooley (2014), "Legends of Garaaga"
Paul E Cooley (2015), "Daemons of Garaaga"
Paul E Cooley (2013), "Tattoo"
Paul E Cooley (2013), "The Hunt" (Tony Downs)
Paul E Cooley (2013), "After Image" (Tony Downs)
Paul E Cooley (2013), "Closet Treats"
Paul E Cooley (2011), "Fiendlettes—4 Stories from the Fiends Collection"
Paul E Cooley (2015), "Mimes"
Paul E, Cooley (2015), "Lamashtu"
Paul E Cooley (2017), "The Rider" (forthcoming, with Scott Sigler)

Audiobooks
Paul E Cooley (2015),"The Black"
Paul E Cooley (2015),"The Black: Arrival"
Paul E. Cooley (2016), "The Black: Outbreak (Coming soon)
Paul E Cooley (2015), "Mimes"
Paul E. Cooley (2015), "Lamashtu"
Paul E. Cooley (2015), "Closet Treats"
Paul E. Cooley (2016), "Daemons of Garaaga"

Podcasts
Shadow Publications (RSS)
Dead Robots Society

References

External links
Shadow Publications
Paul's YouTube channel
Goodreads author page 
Amazon.com author page

1970 births
Living people
Writers from Houston
American science fiction writers
20th-century American novelists
21st-century American novelists
American male novelists
American podcasters
American horror writers
Novelists from Texas
American male short story writers
20th-century American short story writers
21st-century American short story writers
20th-century American male writers
21st-century American male writers